The 1934–35 Prima Divisione was the third level league of the 35th Italian football championship.

In 1928, FIGC had decided a reform of the league structure of Italian football. The top-level league was the National Division, composed by the two divisions of Serie A and Serie B. Under them, there were the local championship, the major one being the First Division, that in 1935 will take the name of Serie C. In order to allow the new league structure for 1935-36 season, the winners of the eight groups of First Division would be admitted to the final rounds, where two tickets of promotion to Serie B were available, while the last eight clubs of each group had to be relegated to the Regional Leagues.

Legend

Girone A

Girone B

Girone C

Girone D

Girone E

Girone F

Girone G

Girone H

Final rounds

Girone A

Girone B

Final 
The final for the title of Italian champion of Prima Divisione wasn't played.

No book or sport newspaper (Gazzetta dello Sport and Il Littoriale) show proofs that the final was actually played.

Footnotes

1934-1935
3
Italy